Pocasset (derived from Wampanoag for at the small cove) may refer to a location in the United States:

 Pocasset, Massachusetts
 Pocasset, Oklahoma
 Pocasset people, a historical of Wampanoag people in Massachusetts
 Pocasset Wampanoag Tribe of Massachusetts and Rhode Island, an unrecognized organization of individuals identifying as Wampanoag descendants